Jorge del Valle (born 10 August 1961) is a Cuban water polo player. He competed in the men's tournament at the 1992 Summer Olympics.

References

External links
 

1961 births
Living people
Place of birth missing (living people)
Cuban male water polo players
Olympic water polo players of Cuba
Water polo players at the 1992 Summer Olympics
Cuban water polo coaches
Cuba women's national water polo team coaches
Pan American Games bronze medalists for Cuba
Water polo players at the 1995 Pan American Games
Pan American Games medalists in water polo
Medalists at the 1995 Pan American Games